Floyd Arthur Kranson (July 24, 1913 – September, 1967) was an American baseball pitcher in the Negro leagues. He played from 1935 to 1940 with the Kansas City Monarchs and the Chicago American Giants. He pitched for the West in the 1936 East-West All-Star Game.

References

External links
 and Baseball-Reference Black Baseball stats and Seamheads

1913 births
1967 deaths
Kansas City Monarchs players
Chicago American Giants players
Baseball players from Louisiana
20th-century African-American sportspeople
Baseball pitchers